Unilateral gratuitous obligations (also known as unilateral voluntary obligations or gratuitous promises) are obligations undertaken voluntarily, when a person promises in definite terms to do something to benefit or favour another, and may therefore be under a legal obligation to keep their promise.

An example would be a promise to donate a sum of money to a charity. This is unilateral, as it imposes a legal obligation on only one person (the donor) and is gratuitous because the other party (the charity) does not do anything in order to be entitled to the money.

Unilateral gratuitous obligations are not a major feature of commercial dealings, but sometimes arise in a business context, such as a promise to keep an offer open for a certain period of time, or a promise to renegotiate the terms of a contract.

In England, gratuitous obligations are not generally regarded as enforceable if verbal or executed under hand. This is because, in English law, there is a doctrine of consideration which requires that both parties must be under an obligation to give something of value before either will be legally bound to an obligation. Gratuitous obligations will only be enforced by the courts if they are constituted by deed.

References

Social ethics